Nicholas Thomas Elko (December 14, 1909 – May 18, 1991) was the third bishop of the Byzantine Catholic Metropolitan Church of Pittsburgh, the American branch of the Ruthenian Catholic Church. At the age of 46 he became the first American-born Bishop of the Greek Catholic Church. He later served as Auxiliary Bishop of the Roman Catholic Archdiocese of Cincinnati, Ohio.

Early life
Born on December 14, 1909, to Rusyn immigrant parents in Donora, Pennsylvania, a steel town in the Monongahela River Valley, he attended the public schools there and in 1930 graduated from Duquesne University in Pittsburgh. He completed graduate theological studies at the Greek Catholic Seminary in Uzhhorod and at the Catholic University of Leuven in Belgium. Bishop Basil Takach ordained him to the priesthood on September 30, 1934, at St. Nicholas Greek Catholic Church in McKeesport, Pennsylvania.

He next served as pastor in several parishes throughout the Exarchate and as the spiritual director of the Greek Catholic Union of the USA, the oldest continuous fraternal benefit society for Rusyn immigrants and their descendants in the U.S. Elko also served in the administration of the Exarchate as Dean of the Cleveland Deanery, Consultor, and eventually as Vicar General. Pope Pius XII in 1952 named him a domestic prelate with the title of Reverend Monsignor. He was appointed that same year as the Rector of the Exarchate's new seminary, the Byzantine Catholic Seminary of SS. Cyril and Methodius.

Bishop Daniel Ivancho appointed Elko in 1954 as the Rector of St. John the Baptist Byzantine Catholic Cathedral. Yet just three months later, Ivancho abruptly resigned as bishop, and the Holy See directed Elko, as the Vicar General of the Exarchate, to administer it. On February 16, 1955, Archbishop Amleto Giovanni Cicognani, the Vatican's delegate to the United States, announced that Elko would be elevated to the episcopacy. On March 6, 1955, he was ordained as bishop at St. Peter's Basilica in Rome, Italy, by Cardinal Eugène-Gabriel-Gervais-Laurent Tisserant, Dean of the College of Cardinals and the Secretary of the Congregation for the Oriental Churches.

Episcopate of Bishop Elko
The formerly immigrant Ruthenian Church was by the 1950s now overwhelmingly American-born and modernizing rapidly in the post-World War II era. Bishop Elko sought to engage the new generation by leading change within the Exarchate. He immediately sought and was granted permission by Rome to permit English, in addition to the ancient liturgical language Old Church Slavonic, to be used in the celebration of the Divine Liturgy.

He next established in 1956 a new weekly newspaper, The Byzantine Catholic World. The term "Byzantine Catholic" was relatively new and represented something of a re-branding for the Church. The term began in usage in the 1940s in an effort to clarify the ritual identification of the Church to the majority American Latin-Rite Catholics, replacing the traditional European appellation of "Greek Catholic". The Church roots were historically "Greek" in the sense that Christianity came to the Slavs in the 9th century by the missionary brothers Saint Cyril and Saint Methodius. But the new name aimed to evoke the even older and more glorious history of Eastern Christianity in Constantinople and the Byzantine Empire.

Elko's administration also undertook the construction of more than one hundred churches and schools. However, in the spirit of Latinism and assimilation, Elko recommended that many traditional Byzantine architectural features, such iconostasis, or as icon screens, be omitted or removed from the new or renovated churches. The Church's membership, largely in the northeastern United States, began to migrate to the West. Elko assigned priests to do organizational work there, and established new parishes in California and Alaska.

Rome upgrades the American Church's status
Since its inception in 1924 as the "Apostolic Exarchate of United States of America, Faithful of the Oriental Rite (Ruthenian)", the organizational status of Elko's American Greek Catholic Church was merely that of a missionary territory with limited self-governing authority, the homeland being Europe—albeit under Communist persecution since 1946.

On July 6, 1963, the Vatican upgraded the status of the church from Exarchate to Eparchy, or diocese according to the Latin-Rite terminology. A decree by the newly elected Pope Paul VI  divided the entire U.S. territory of the Church into two separate ecclesiastical jurisdictions. The first, centered in Passaic, New Jersey, included the Eastern states and the second jurisdiction, centered in Pittsburgh, included the rest of the nation. Both jurisdictions now held the canonical status of an eparchy or a full diocese. Elko continued as the American Church's senior hierarch, but a new bishop, Stephen Kocisko, was installed for Passaic.

The Second Vatican Council and the Eastern Catholic Churches
Elko was appointed a Consultor to the Congregation for the Oriental Churches and took part in the proceedings, held in Rome from 1962 to 1965, of the Second Vatican Council. It issued a decree, promulgated by Paul VI on November 21, 1964, titled Orientalium Ecclesiarum. The new policy underscored the richness of the Eastern Rite churches and respect for them. It urged Eastern Rites to return to the roots of their distinctive rituals and to avoid Latinization of their practices.

The decree heartened anti-latinizers in the Byzantine Church, and to many seemed a repudiation of Elko's "reforms", particularly during the building boom of the previous years.

Controversy
By 1967, Elko's popularity within his own Church waned on account of the rapid change he led, the confusion among laity around many Vatican II reforms, and especially Elko's authoritarian management style. Whether priest or laity, ethnic or assimilated, many in the Church were agitated by Elko's leadership. Petitions were signed and sent off to Rome. The Vatican, fearing more dissension in the Church like that experienced during the 1930s, transferred Elko to Rome, where he was elevated to the dignity of an Archbishop and appointed as the ordaining prelate for the Byzantine Catholics in Rome and head of the Ecumenical Commission on the Liturgy. This prompted his resignation as Byzantine Catholic Bishop of Pittsburgh, and Monsignor Edward V. Rosack, the Chancellor of the Eparchy, was named as the temporary apostolic administrator.

Time Magazine reported on the unusual situation, noting that a "bishop is almost never separated from his see. For the past seven months, however, the Most Rev. Nicholas T. Elko, Ruthenian-rite bishop of Pittsburgh, has been in Rome, barred by his church superiors from returning to his diocese. The case of Bishop Elko, who describes his situation as 'exile', casts fascinating light on Catholicism's current internal stresses...". Three years later, the Vatican sent Elko back to the U.S., but not to his Byzantine Church.

Transition: The Roman Catholic Archdiocese of Cincinnati
In 1970 Archbishop Elko started anew as Auxiliary Archbishop in the Roman Catholic Archdiocese of Cincinnati (the first and only Eastern Rite Bishop to serve as Auxiliary of a Latin Rite Diocese in the U.S.). He served in this capacity for fourteen years, and upon reaching his seventy-fifth birthday, retired.

He wrote an historical novel at this time, which was published posthumously in 1994. White Heat Over Red Fire features Thomas Christophe, a young Eastern Rite Catholic Bishop ministering in post-war Austria. The novel makes much of the intrigues of the Cold War years, the struggles of the Church in Eastern Europe, the attempts to reconcile the Catholic and Eastern Orthodox Churches, and the upheaval within the Catholic Church in the wake of Vatican II.

Elko died of cancer on May 18, 1991, aged 81.
He is interred in the Priest's Circle at Gate of Heaven Cemetery, Montgomery, Ohio.

External links
 Nicholas Elko biodata at Catholic-Hierarchy.org
 The Byzantine Catholic Archeparchy of Pittsburgh
 Byzantine Catholic Church in America

References

I had the honor to be Archbishop Elko's assistant for 3 years. He was a true son of Mary and loved our Lord and lived the life. In the last 2 years I was with him, we created a mission project entitled: "ROSARIES AROUND THE WORLD". We shipped to over 40 countries and a total of over 1,000,000 Rosaries and Scapulars. They went from St. Mother Teresa to Fr. Malachy Brogan, OFM. He wrote me once saying: "Jim, the Rosaries you sent are now found in the hands of the praying, the dying and the dead." This was funded in total by the good Archbishop's brother and blessed by Archbishop Elko and St. Pope John Paul II. 

1909 births
1991 deaths
People from Donora, Pennsylvania
Ruthenian Catholic bishops
American Eastern Catholic bishops
American people of Rusyn descent
Participants in the Second Vatican Council
Religious leaders from Pittsburgh
Duquesne University alumni
Roman Catholic Archdiocese of Cincinnati
Burials in Ohio
20th-century American clergy